The 1899 Colorado Silver and Gold football team was an American football team that represented the University of Colorado as a member of the Colorado Football Association (CFA) during the 1899 college football season. Led by fifth-year head coach Fred Folsom, Colorado compiled an overall record of 7–2 with a mark of 2–1 in conference play, placing second in the CFA.

Schedule

References

Colorado
Colorado Buffaloes football seasons
Colorado Silver and Gold football